Pitcairnia fendleri is a plant species in the genus Pitcairnia. This species is endemic to Venezuela.

References

fendleri
Flora of Venezuela